The North Carolina Tar Heels college football team represents the University of North Carolina at Chapel Hill in the Coastal Division of the Atlantic Coast Conference (ACC). The Tar Heels compete as part of the National Collegiate Athletic Association (NCAA) Division I Football Bowl Subdivision. The program has had 34 head coaches, and one interim head coach, since it began play during the 1888 season. Since November 2018, Mack Brown has served as North Carolina's head coach. Brown is in his second stint as Tar Heel head coach, having previously led the Tar Heels from 1988–1997.

The Tar Heels have played more than 1,100 games over 122 seasons. In that time, 10 coaches have led the Tar Heels in postseason bowl games: Carl Snavely, Jim Hickey, Bill Dooley, Dick Crum, Mack Brown, Carl Torbush, John Bunting, Butch Davis, Everett Withers, and Larry Fedora. Four of those coaches also won conference championships: Snavely captured three as a member of the Southern Conference and Hickey, Dooley, and Crum won a combined five as a member of the ACC.

Brown is the leader in games won (90) during his 13 years with the program. Branch Bocock has the highest winning percentage of those who have coached more than one game, with .812. Gene McEver has the lowest winning percentage of those who have coached more than one game, with .067.Of the 33 different head coaches who have led the Tar Heels, Jim Tatum and Snavely have been inducted into the College Football Hall of Fame. Brown was also named to the Hall, but was inducted as a Texas Longhorn.

Key

Coaches

Notes

References
General

 
 

Specific

North Carolina

North Carolina sports-related lists